Mafi-Kumase is a town in the Volta Region of Ghana. It is located in the Central Tongu District. According to the Ghana Statistical Service's 2010 Population and Housing Census, the population of Mafi-Kumase was 2,461.

The town is known for the  Mafi-Kumase Senior High Technical School and the commercial production of Garri|Gari. One of the largest and most attended markets in the Volta region is the Mafi-Kumase market. It normally operates every Monday. The people are basically farmers and very hardworking.  The school is a second cycle institution.

References

Populated places in the Volta Region